National Road 95 is one of the main arteries on the island of Rhodes, Greece. It connects the city of Rhodes with the village of Lindos.

History 
Current routing is fairly new as it was completed in 1974 replacing the old national road which was narrow and curvy. Until 1999 it was a single carriageway that, especially during summer time, made driving to the south east part of the island a bad experience. In 1999 the first part of the road from the city to Faliraki was expanded to a dual carriageway with 4 lanes and jersey barrier island. Nowadays (Jun18) further widening of the road from Faliraki to Kolympia is completed and in use.

Route

GR-95 is a 46 km north–south avenue connecting Rhodes City to Lindos. Its northern end is supposedly at the port of Rhodes City but in reality becomes an avenue at Exit 1/Rodini Junction. From there up until Exit 21/Kolympia is dual carriageway with speed limits varying due to passing within residential and tourist areas. Due to lack of funds, almost all main junctions till Kolympia are traffic lighted - some 20 exits with traffic lights are in use currently. From Kolympia to Lindos the road becomes single carriageway making junctions hard to record, as every 50 or 100 metres one exists. Since 2014, roundabouts were constructed in major crossroads in this part of GR-95.

The main junctions of the road are (Rhodes City to Lindos direction):

Future plans
In June 2018 South Aegean regional governor announced that further widening of the avenue from Kolympia to Lindos is back on track as a works prestudy and an environmental study were finally submitted for approval and estimating that by 2019 June the complete study will be ready in order for funds to be allocated and proceed with a tender. According to same announcement, the prestudy includes same characteristics as the Rhodes to Kolympia section meaning two lanes per direction divided by a jersey island while for the first time constructions of 3 interchanges is included. Moreover, avenue will follow a new route in the rocky area surrounding Tsambika monastery bypassing it on the northwest end instead of the current southeast route.

Its also worth noting that if and when city ring road phase 2 goes ahead, an interchange is planned connecting Rhodes-Lindos Avenue to the ring road. Finally, a useful addition would be interchanges at exits 1, 4 and 7 which are usually congested and accidents are not rare.

External links

Notes

95
Buildings and structures in Rhodes
Roads in the South Aegean